Baima Township is a township of Guang'an District, Guang'an, Sichuan, People's Republic of China, located  northeast of downtown as the crow flies.

, it administers Minxin Residential Community and the following six villages:
Baima Village
Shihe Village
Guoguang Village
Hongxing Village
Shiti Village
Tongxin Village

See also 
 List of township-level divisions of Sichuan

References 

Township-level divisions of Sichuan
Guang'an